The Hawker Danecock biplane was developed from the Hawker Woodcock for the Danish air force and naval service.

Design and development
In 1925 the Danish Government notified Hawker that they would order three aircraft similar to the Woodcock, but with certain improvements. This resulted in Sydney Camm making minor changes to the wings and cockpit area. Compared to the Woodcock II, the Danecock had unequal span wings, a slightly lengthened fuselage, a 385 hp (287 kW) Armstrong Siddeley Jaguar IV engine and an armament of two  Madsen machine guns. The first aircraft was flown on 18 December 1925 by George Bulman with all three aircraft delivered in February 1926.

Operational history
After receiving the Hawker-built aircraft, Denmark obtained a licence to produce more Danecocks. This version, named the Dankok, was built in 1927 at the Danish Royal Naval Dockyard (Orlogsvaerftet) as the Orlogsvaerftet L.B.II. A total of 12 more were manufactured. One aircraft (a Hawker-build) broke the Scandinavian altitude record, reaching 28,208 ft (8,598 m). The Danecock/Dankok served until the mid-1930s when they were replaced by Hawker Nimrods. An example of the Dankok still exists in the Copenhagen Museum.

Operators

Danish Army Air Service (Hærens Flyvertropper)
Danish Naval Air Service (Marinens Flyvevæsen)

Specifications

See also

References

1920s British fighter aircraft
Danecock
Single-engined tractor aircraft
Biplanes
Aircraft first flown in 1925